Mario Alejandro Benítez Valencia (born August 17, 1983) is a Colombian footballer who last played for Al Shabab of Saudi Arabia.

External links
 BDFA profile

1983 births
Living people
Colombian footballers
Colombian expatriate footballers
Categoría Primera A players
Atlético Huila footballers
Once Caldas footballers
Envigado F.C. players
Cúcuta Deportivo footballers
Millonarios F.C. players
Independiente Santa Fe footballers
Portuguesa F.C. players
El Porvenir footballers
Real Cartagena footballers
C.D. Luis Ángel Firpo footballers
Al-Shabab FC (Riyadh) players
Expatriate footballers in Venezuela
Expatriate footballers in El Salvador
Expatriate footballers in Argentina
Expatriate footballers in Saudi Arabia
Saudi Professional League players
Association football forwards
People from Caldas Department